The Calgary Flames are a professional ice hockey team based in Calgary. The Flames compete in the National Hockey League (NHL) as a member of the  Pacific Division in the Western Conference, and are the third major professional ice hockey team to represent the city of Calgary, following the Calgary Tigers (1921–1927) and Calgary Cowboys (1975–1977). The Flames are one of two NHL franchises based in Alberta, the other being the Edmonton Oilers. The cities' proximity has led to a rivalry known as the "Battle of Alberta".

The team was founded in 1972 in Atlanta as the Atlanta Flames before relocating to Calgary in 1980. The Flames played their first three seasons in Calgary at the Stampede Corral before moving into the Scotiabank Saddledome (originally the Olympic Saddledome) in 1983. In 1985–86, the Flames became the first Calgary team since the 1923–24 Tigers to compete for the Stanley Cup. In 1988–89, the Flames won their first and only Stanley Cup title. The Flames' unexpected run to the 2004 Stanley Cup Finals gave rise to the Red Mile, and in 2011, the team hosted and won the second Heritage Classic outdoor game.

The Flames have won two Presidents' Trophies as the NHL's top regular-season team, and have claimed eight division championships. Individually, Jarome Iginla is the franchise leader in games played, goals and points, and is a two-time winner of the Maurice "Rocket" Richard Trophy as the NHL's leading goal scorer. Miikka Kiprusoff has the most wins by a goaltender in a Calgary Flames uniform. Eleven people associated with the Flames have been inducted into the Hockey Hall of Fame.

Off the ice, Calgary Sports and Entertainment, which owns the Flames, also own a Western Hockey League franchise (the Calgary Hitmen), a National Lacrosse League franchise (the Calgary Roughnecks), a Canadian Football League franchise (the Calgary Stampeders), and an American Hockey League franchise (the Calgary Wranglers). Through the Flames Foundation, the team has donated over million to charity throughout southern Alberta since the franchise arrived.

Franchise history

Atlanta Flames (1972–1980)

The Flames were the result of the NHL's first pre-emptive strike against the upstart World Hockey Association (WHA). In December 1971, the NHL hastily granted a team to Long Island — the New York Islanders — in an attempt to keep the WHA's New York Raiders out of the recently completed Nassau Veterans Memorial Coliseum. Needing another team to balance the schedule, the NHL awarded a team to the Atlanta-based group that owned the National Basketball Association's Atlanta Hawks, headed by prominent local real estate developer Tom Cousins. Cousins named the team the "Flames" after the fire resulting from the March to the Sea in the American Civil War by General William Tecumseh Sherman, in which Atlanta was nearly destroyed. They played home games in the Omni Coliseum in downtown Atlanta.

The Flames were relatively successful early on. Under head coaches Bernie "Boom Boom" Geoffrion, Fred Creighton and Al MacNeil, the Flames made the playoffs in six of eight seasons in Atlanta. In marked contrast, their expansion cousins, the Islanders, won only 31 games during their first two years in the league combined. However, this success did not carry over to the playoffs, as the Flames won only two postseason games during their time in Atlanta.

Despite the on-ice success, the Atlanta ownership was never on sound financial footing. Longtime general manager Cliff Fletcher said years later that Cousins' initial financial projections for an NHL team did not account for the WHA entering the picture. The Flames were also a poor draw, and never signed a major television contract.

In 1980, Cousins was in considerable financial difficulty and was forced to sell the Flames to stave off bankruptcy. With few serious offers from local groups, he was very receptive to an offer from Canadian entrepreneur (and former Oilers owner) Nelson Skalbania. He was fronting a group of Calgary businessmen that included oil magnates Harley Hotchkiss, Ralph T. Scurfield, Norman Green, Doc and Byron Seaman, and former Calgary Stampeders great Norman Kwong. A last-ditch effort to keep the team in Atlanta fell short, and Cousins sold the team to Skalbania for US$16 million, a record sale price for an NHL team at the time. On May 21, 1980, Skalbania announced that the team would move to Calgary. He chose to retain the Flames name, feeling it would be a good fit for an oil town like Calgary, while the flaming "A" logo was replaced by a flaming "C". Skalbania sold his interest in 1981, and the Flames have been locally owned since.

Early years in Calgary (1980–1985)
Unlike the WHA's Calgary Cowboys, who folded three years earlier, the Flames were immediately embraced by the city of Calgary. While the Cowboys could manage to sell only 2,000 season tickets in their final campaign of 1976–77, the Flames sold 10,000 full- and half-season ticket packages in the 7,000 seat Stampede Corral.

Led by Kent Nilsson's 49-goal, 131-point season, the Flames qualified for the playoffs in their first season in Calgary with a 39–27–14 record, good for third in the Patrick Division. The team found much greater playoff success in Calgary than it did in Atlanta, winning their first two playoff series over the Chicago Black Hawks and Philadelphia Flyers before bowing out to the Minnesota North Stars in the semi-finals. This early success was not soon repeated. After a losing record in 1981–82, Fletcher jettisoned several holdovers from the Atlanta days who could not adjust to the higher-pressure hockey environment and rebuilt the roster. Over the next three seasons, he put together a core of players that remained together through the early 1990s.

Fletcher's efforts to match the Oilers led him to draw talent from areas previously neglected by the NHL. The Flames were among the earliest teams to sign large numbers of U.S. college players, including Joel Otto, Gary Suter and Colin Patterson. Fletcher also stepped up the search for European hockey talent, acquiring Hakan Loob and other key players. He was among the first to draft players from the Soviet Union, including CSKA Moscow star Sergei Makarov in 1983, but Soviet players were not released to Western teams until 1989. Still, the team was sufficiently improved to challenge the Oilers, who required the maximum seven games to defeat the Flames en route to their 1984 Stanley Cup Championship.

In 1983, the Flames moved into their new home, the Olympic Saddledome (now known as the Scotiabank Saddledome). Located on the grounds of the Calgary Exhibition and Stampede, the Saddledome was built as a venue for the 1988 Winter Olympics. In three seasons in the Corral, the Flames lost only 32 home games. The Saddledome hosted the NHL All-Star Game in 1985, a 6–4 victory by the Wales Conference.

Presidents' Trophies and Stanley Cup Finals (1985–1990)
The players acquired by Fletcher matured into one of the strongest teams in the NHL during the mid-1980s and early 1990s. From 1984–85 to 1990–91, the Flames tallied 90 points in every season but one. However, they were usually unable to transform that success into a deep playoff run, largely because they could not get the better of their provincial rivals, the powerhouse Edmonton Oilers. The Oilers and Flames usually finished at or near the top of the Campbell Conference and were usually among the best teams in the entire league during this time. However, the NHL's playoff structure of the time made it very likely the Flames would meet the Oilers in either the first or second round, rather than in the Campbell Conference finals. That same structure made it very likely that the other two playoff qualifiers in the Smythe Division would have to get past the Flames or Oilers (or both) in order to make it to the conference finals. From 1983 until 1990, either the Oilers or the Flames represented the Campbell Conference in the Stanley Cup Finals.
By 1986, the Flames landed forwards Doug Risebrough, Lanny McDonald and Dan Quinn, defenceman Al MacInnis and goaltender Mike Vernon. Finishing second in the Smythe with a 40–31–9 record (the only season from 1984 to 1991 in which they did not finish with 90 or more points), the Flames swept the Winnipeg Jets in the first round of the playoffs, setting up a showdown with the Oilers. Edmonton finished 30 points ahead of Calgary during the season, and was heavily favoured to win a third Cup in a row. However, the Flames upset the Oilers in seven games, the only time the Flames defeated the Oilers in a playoff series in the decade. The series-winning goal came when an errant clearing attempt by Steve Smith ricocheted off goaltender Grant Fuhr's leg and into his own net. The goal remains one of the most legendary blunders in hockey history.

From there, the Flames went on to the Campbell Conference Finals, where they defeated the St. Louis Blues in another seven-game series. This time, Calgary had to survive a scare of its own, shaking off the Monday Night Miracle at the St. Louis Arena. Trailing by a score of 5–2 with ten minutes to play in the third period of Game 6, the Blues mounted a furious comeback to send the contest into overtime, where Doug Wickenheiser scored to force a deciding seventh game. Calgary won Game 7 at home, 2–1, advancing into the Stanley Cup Finals for the first time. The Flames proved to be no match for the Montreal Canadiens, losing the championship series in five games. Montreal rookie goaltender Patrick Roy was nearly unbeatable in the last two games, allowing only four goals en route to winning the Conn Smythe Trophy.

The Flames followed up their run to the Finals with their best regular season to that point. Calgary's 46–31–3 record in 1986–87 was good for third overall in the NHL, behind the Oilers and Philadelphia Flyers. However, the Flames were unable to duplicate their playoff success of a year prior, losing their first-round match-up with the Jets in six games. The season was also difficult off the ice, as 1986 first-round draft pick George Pelawa was killed in a car accident prior to the season's start.

Under new head coach Terry Crisp, the Flames recorded their first 100-point season in 1987–88, earning the Presidents' Trophy for having the NHL's best record and ending the Oilers' six-year reign atop the Smythe Division in the process. Joe Nieuwendyk became the second rookie in NHL history to score at least 50 goals in a season, earning the Calder Memorial Trophy as rookie of the year. Looking to bolster the line-up for a playoff run, the Flames traded young sniper Brett Hull (along with Steve Bozek) to the Blues in exchange for Rob Ramage and Rick Wamsley on March 7, 1988. However, their playoff frustrations continued after defeating the Los Angeles Kings in five games, as Calgary was swept out of the playoffs in four straight by the Oilers.

In 1988–89, the Flames continued to improve. They captured their second consecutive Presidents' Trophy with a franchise record 117 points, finishing 26 points better than the second-place Kings in the Smythe Division. Fletcher continued to tinker with the roster, acquiring Doug Gilmour as part of a six player deal at the trade deadline. In the playoffs, the Flames were stretched to seven games in the first round by the Vancouver Canucks. They relied on several saves by goaltender Mike Vernon, including a famous glove save off a Stan Smyl breakaway in overtime. The save remains a defining moment in Flames history.

The Flames then made short work of the Kings, defeating them in four straight, before eliminating the Chicago Blackhawks in five games to set up a rematch of the 1986 Stanley Cup Finals against Montreal. This time, the Flames won in six games, the last being a 4–2 victory in Montreal on May 25, 1989. The clinching win was especially significant in that it marked the only time that an opposing team defeated the Canadiens to win the Stanley Cup on Montreal Forum ice. Al MacInnis captured the Conn Smythe as playoffs' most valuable player, while long-time captain Lanny McDonald announced his retirement. The 1989 Stanley Cup win gave Flames co-owner Sonia Scurfield (Ralph's widow) the distinction of being the first (and as of 2013, only) Canadian woman to have her name engraved on the Cup. It also made Kwong one of the few to have his name on both the Stanley Cup and the Grey Cup.

In 1989, due in part to Cliff Fletcher's diplomatic efforts, the Soviets gave permission for a select group of Soviet hockey players to sign with NHL teams. The first of these players was Sergei Pryakhin. Although Pryakhin never became an NHL regular, his arrival blazed a trail for the large number of Russian players who entered the NHL beginning in 1989–90. Sergei Makarov joined the Flames that season and, though already in his 30s, became the fifth Flame to win the Calder Memorial Trophy as the NHL's Rookie of the Year. The selection proved controversial, prompting the NHL to amend the rules to exclude any player over age 26 from future consideration. That season, the team fell two points shy of their third-straight Presidents' Trophy with 99 points. Also that season, they won their third straight Smythe Division title. In the playoffs, they were dethroned in six games by the Los Angeles Kings. They did not win another playoff series until 2004, one of the longest such droughts in NHL history.

Playoff contention to playoff drought (1991–2003)
In 1991, Fletcher left the Flames to become the general manager of the Toronto Maple Leafs. He had been the team's general manager since its inception in 1972. He was succeeded in Calgary by Doug Risebrough, and the two quickly completed a ten-player mega-trade that saw disgruntled forward Doug Gilmour dealt to Toronto with four other players in exchange for former 50-goal scorer Gary Leeman and four others. The trade transformed both clubs. The formerly inept Leafs turned into a contender almost immediately, while Leeman scored only 11 goals in a Flames uniform. Despite the blossoming of Theoren Fleury into an NHL star, the Flames missed the playoffs entirely in 1992, only a year after finishing with their third 100-point season in franchise history. It was the first time the Flames had missed the playoffs since 1975, when they were still in Atlanta. It was also only the third time out of the playoffs in the franchise's 20-year history.

Calgary rebounded to make the playoffs for the next four seasons, including two consecutive division titles. However, they were eliminated in the first round of the playoffs each time. The 1994 and 1995 Division titles led to Game 7 overtime home defeats in the opening round to the Canucks and San Jose Sharks respectively. In the 1995–96 season, Joe Nieuwendyk was traded to the Dallas Stars in a deal that acquired Jarome Iginla. Iginla made his Flames debut in the 1996 playoffs during which the Flames again lost in the first round, a four-game sweep by the Blackhawks. In 1997, only two years after winning their second consecutive division title, the Flames missed the playoffs and did not return for seven years. The low point came in the 1997–98 season, in which the Flames finished with only 67 points, the second-lowest point total in franchise history (behind only the 1972–73 Atlanta Flames).

During this time, the Flames found it increasingly difficult to retain their best players as salaries escalated while the Canadian dollar lost value against the American dollar. Calgary has always been one of the smallest markets in the NHL (it is currently third-smallest, behind only Edmonton and Winnipeg) and the NHL's small-market Canadian teams found it increasingly difficult to compete in the new environment. In 1999, for example, the Flames traded Fleury to the Colorado Avalanche midway through the season. The trade came shortly after Fleury became the franchise's all-time leading scorer. Fleury was due to become an unrestricted free agent at the end of the season, and the Flames did not want to risk losing him without getting anything in return.

As the Flames sank in the standings, their attendance also sagged. For most of their first 16 years in Calgary, Flames tickets were among the toughest to get in the NHL. However, by 1999, attendance had fallen off so severely that the owners issued an ultimatum: buy more season tickets or the team would join its departed counterparts in Winnipeg and Quebec City in leaving for the United States. The fans responded by buying enough season tickets to keep the Flames in Calgary for the 1999–2000 season. The Flames issued another appeal for more season tickets in the summer of 2000. The campaign, aimed at increasing season ticket sales from a franchise low of 8,700 to 14,000, proved successful. However, the increased sales did not halt the Flames' financial losses, as the team estimated it lost $14.5 million between 2001 and 2003.

One of the few bright spots in this stretch was Iginla, who captured the Maurice "Rocket" Richard and Art Ross Trophies in 2001–02 as NHL goal- and point-scoring champion after scoring 52 goals and 96 points. Iginla again won the "Rocket" Richard Trophy, tied with Rick Nash and Ilya Kovalchuk, with 41 goals in 2003–04. Another bright spot for the team during this time was defenceman Robyn Regehr, who became the youngest nominee ever for the Bill Masterton Memorial Trophy, which recognizes perseverance, sportsmanship and dedication to hockey. Regehr had suffered two broken legs in a car accident the summer of 1999, but recovered in time to play 57 games at age 19.

During the 2002–03 season, the Flames hired Darryl Sutter as the team's head coach, replacing Greg Gilbert, who was fired as the Flames languished in last place in the Western Conference. Sutter also became the team's general manager following the season, and is credited with revitalizing the franchise. Among Sutter's first moves was to acquire goaltender Miikka Kiprusoff, whom he had previously coached in San Jose, early in the 2003–04 season. Kiprusoff responded by setting a modern NHL record for lowest goals against average (GAA) at 1.69.

Jarome Iginla era and Western Conference champions (2004–2010)
After seven consecutive seasons of not making the playoffs, the Flames finally returned to the postseason in 2004. They became the first team in the league's history to defeat three division champions en route to becoming the first Canadian team to make it to the Stanley Cup Finals since the Canucks in 1994. The Flames' first victim was the Northwest Division champion Vancouver Canucks, whom they defeated in seven games. It was the Flames' first playoff series win since they won the 1989 final.

The Flames then upset the Presidents' Trophy winning Detroit Red Wings in six games. After eliminating the Pacific Division champion San Jose Sharks, also in six games, in the Western Conference Final, the Flames earned a trip to the 2004 Stanley Cup Finals to face the Tampa Bay Lightning. Martin Gelinas scored the winning goal in all three series. The Canadian Embassy in Washington, D.C., flew the Flames flag beside the Maple Leaf, while Prime Minister Paul Martin dubbed the Flames "Canada's team".

The final series went to seven games, with the Flames suffering a controversial non-goal in Game 6 at home. Replays showed Martin Gelinas may have scored what would have been the go-ahead goal late in the third period; however, the referees never signalled a goal, and later replays were ruled inconclusive. The goal would have made Gelinas the only player in NHL history to score the winning goal in every playoff series en route to winning the Stanley Cup. The Lightning went on to win the game in double overtime, before winning game seven at home to capture the Stanley Cup. Despite the loss, 30,000 fans packed into Olympic Plaza to celebrate the Flames' run.

The Flames did not raise their Western Conference championship banner for nearly 15 months, as the 2004–05 season was wiped out by a labour dispute. During the lock-out, team owner and chairman of the board Harley Hotchkiss attempted to save the season by engaging in discussions with National Hockey League Players' Association (NHLPA) president Trevor Linden. While their discussions failed to save the season, Hotchkiss was credited with easing tensions that allowed for a successful negotiation of a new collective agreement.

The Flames played their 25th season in Calgary in 2005–06, finishing with 103 points. It was their best total since the 1989 Cup winning season, and good enough to capture their first division title in 12 years. However, the Flames lost to the Mighty Ducks of Anaheim in seven games during the first round of the playoffs. Miikka Kiprusoff captured both the William M. Jennings and Vezina Trophies as the NHL's top goaltender, while Dion Phaneuf's 20 goals was the third-highest total for a rookie defenceman in NHL history.

The 2006 off-season began with a trade for Alex Tanguay, formerly of the Colorado Avalanche, and with Sutter relinquishing his head coaching position to assistant Jim Playfair so he could focus on his duties as general manager. Despite a marked improvement in team offence and a solid 96-point season, it was only good enough for eighth place in a Western Conference, where seven teams cracked the 100-point barrier. In the playoffs, Calgary fell in six games to the top-seeded Detroit Red Wings in the first round. During the series, the Flames were fined by the NHL for several stick-related penalties in the fifth game. Notably, backup goaltender Jamie McLennan was suspended five games for slashing Red Wings forward Johan Franzen. Franzen scored the series-clinching goal in the Game 6 defeat in double overtime.

Prior to the start of the 2007–08 season, the Flames demoted Playfair to associate coach, bringing in Mike Keenan as the team's third head coach in three years. During the season, Jarome Iginla became the Flames' all-time leader in games played, passing Al MacInnis' mark of 803. Iginla also passed Theoren Fleury's mark of 364 goals to become the Flames' all-time goalscoring leader on March 10, 2008. Despite another solid season with 94 points, they only garnered the seventh seed in the Western Conference. They fell in the Western Conference quarter-finals to the Pacific Division champion San Jose Sharks in seven games. Iginla continued to set franchise records in 2008–09, surpassing Fleury's franchise mark of 830 points, and scoring his 400th goal on the same night against the Tampa Bay Lightning. The team failed to advance past the first round of the playoffs, being eliminated by the Chicago Blackhawks in six games, resulting in the dismissal of head coach Mike Keenan after two seasons. Brent Sutter was named his successor on June 23, 2009, but the Flames failed to qualify for the playoffs in the 2009–10 season.

End of the Iginla era (2011–2013)
The Flames struggled to begin the 2010–11 NHL season, falling to 14th place in the conference at the Christmas break. Consequently, the organization asked Darryl Sutter to step aside as general manager. The team named assistant Jay Feaster the interim general manager in his place, making it permanent following the season. The team pulled itself back into playoff contention following the change but once again failed to qualify for the playoffs.

Calgary hosted the 2011 Heritage Classic, the NHL's second outdoor game of the year, at McMahon Stadium on February 22, 2011. The Flames defeated the Montreal Canadiens 4–0 before 41,022 spectators. Miikka Kiprusoff became the first goaltender to record a shutout in an NHL outdoor game. Jarome Iginla reached two major milestones late in the season—he became the tenth player in NHL history to score at least 30 goals in ten consecutive seasons, and scored his 1,000th career point, all with the Flames, with a goal against the St. Louis Blues on April 1. Iginla also scored his 500th career goal on January 7, 2012, against the Minnesota Wild. He scored the goal against goaltender Niklas Backstrom en route to a 3–1 Flames victory.
On March 27, 2013, long-time captain and player Jarome Iginla was traded to the Pittsburgh Penguins in exchange for prospects Kenny Agostino and Ben Hanowski and a first-round pick in 2013 (Morgan Klimchuk), leaving the team without a captain for the first time. The Flames missed the playoffs once again in 2012–13, selecting Sean Monahan sixth overall at the 2013 NHL Entry Draft after the season.

Giordano, Monahan, Gaudreau era (2013–2021)

Prior to the beginning of the 2013–14 season, Mark Giordano was named as the new captain of the Flames. Aided from a 22-goal rookie effort from Monahan, the Flames nonetheless endured a poor season, watching 2012–13 co-leading scorers Mike Cammalleri and Lee Stempniak leave in free agency in the summer. However, a bright spot came in the season's final game against the Vancouver Canucks, as 2011 fourth-round draft pick Johnny Gaudreau made his much-anticipated debut after winning the Hobey Baker Award at Boston College the day before. Gaudreau recorded his first NHL goal in the contest, the lone goal in a 5–1 Flames loss.

In the 2014–15 season, the Flames, led by Mark Giordano, Sean Monahan, Johnny Gaudreau, and Jiri Hudler, won one of their final home games against the Los Angeles Kings to clinch their first playoff berth since 2009, eliminating the defending champion Kings from playoff contention in the progress. They eliminated the Vancouver Canucks in six games in the first round of the playoffs for their first playoff series win since 2004, but were eliminated by the Anaheim Ducks in five games in the second round. Head coach Bob Hartley was named the winner of the Jack Adams Trophy for coach of the year, while Hudler capped off his career-best 76-point season (good for eighth in the NHL) with the Lady Byng Memorial Trophy for most gentlemanly player.
In the 2015–16 season, the Flames faced heightened expectations after their surprising 2014–15 year. These expectations were bolstered after the unexpected acquisition of Dougie Hamilton from the Boston Bruins for a first-round pick and two second-round picks at the 2015 NHL Entry Draft. However, along with the other six Canadian teams, the Flames failed to qualify for the playoffs. As a result, in May 2016, head coach Bob Hartley was relieved of his duties. He was replaced by former Vancouver Canucks assistant coach Glen Gulutzan. Aided by their poor finish, the Flames were able to select Matthew Tkachuk with the sixth selection at the 2016 NHL Entry Draft.

The Flames acquired veterans Troy Brouwer, Kris Versteeg, Alex Chiasson, Brian Elliott and Chad Johnson in the 2016 off-season, but overshadowing these additions were the ongoing negotiations with pending restricted free agents Sean Monahan and Johnny Gaudreau. Monahan agreed to a seven-year contract worth $44.625 million on August 19, 2016; Gaudreau held out through the pre-season before signing a six-year, $40.5 million contract on October 10. Bolstered by the emergence of the "3M Line", composed of Tkachuk, Mikael Backlund and Michael Frolik, the Flames rebounded to make the playoffs in the 2016–17 season as the conference's first wild card seed, but they were swept by the Anaheim Ducks in the first round.

However, during the 2017–18 season, the Flames once again failed to qualify for the playoffs, and Glen Gulutzan was relieved of his coaching duties in mid-April. Bill Peters was hired as head coach on April 23. The 2017–18 season was highlighted by the Flames debut of Jaromir Jagr in October, but the Czech former star only lasted 22 games in Calgary, scoring 7 points.

The Flames made several changes to their roster before the 2018–19 season including a blockbuster trade with the Carolina Hurricanes at the 2018 NHL Entry Draft, agreeing to send Dougie Hamilton, Micheal Ferland, and Adam Fox to the Hurricanes in exchange for Noah Hanifin and Elias Lindholm. Flames general manager Brad Treliving was also active in free agency, signing scoring winger James Neal from Vegas on a five-year contract, utility centre Derek Ryan from Carolina on a three-year contract, high-scoring AHL winger Austin Czarnik from the Boston Bruins on a two-year contract, and depth forward Alan Quine from the New York Islanders on a one-year contract. During the 2018–19 season, the Flames retired Jarome Iginla's No. 12 jersey on March 2, 2019. At the end of the regular season, they won the division title for the first time since 2006, clinching the top seed in the conference for the 2019 Stanley Cup playoffs on March 31, 2019. They ultimately finished with 50 wins and 107 points, in both cases the second-most in franchise history behind the 1988–89 Stanley Cup championship team. They went on to lose in the first round to the Colorado Avalanche in five games. At the end of season, club captain Mark Giordano was awarded the James Norris Memorial Trophy after becoming the fifth defenceman in NHL history to record 60 points at the age of 35 or over.

For the 2019–20 season, the Flames had some roster turnover with free agent goaltender Mike Smith signing with the Edmonton Oilers, while the Oilers' goaltender Cam Talbot signed a one-year-deal with the Flames. On July 19, 2019, they traded James Neal to the Oilers in exchange for winger Milan Lucic and a third-round pick in the 2020 NHL Entry Draft. The Flames re-signed Matthew Tkachuk to a new three-year deal, making him the highest paid player on the Flames' roster, as well as re-signing goaltender David Rittich, and wingers Sam Bennett, and Andrew Mangiapane.

Following accusations against head coach Bill Peters of racism and physical violence by former Flames' prospect Akim Aliu, Peters was forced to take a leave of absence on November 26, pending the outcome of an internal investigation. Assistant coach Geoff Ward was named the acting head coach during the investigation. Peters resigned on November 29 and Ward was named the interim head coach. After Peters' resignation, interim head coach Ward broke a franchise record by starting his coaching tenure with 7 straight wins. The Flames only played 70 games in the regular season, which ended after March 11, 2020, due to the coronavirus pandemic. Based on their regular-season points percentage, they qualified for the playoffs as the eighth seed in the Western Conference and defeated the Winnipeg Jets in four games in the qualifying round. The Flames faced the Dallas Stars in the first round of the playoffs, but lost the series in six games.

On March 4, 2021, Ward was fired and former head coach and general manager Darryl Sutter was re-hired as head coach of the Flames.

High-profile turnover (2021–present)
Giordano's tenure as captain ended when he was selected by the Seattle Kraken in the 2021 NHL Expansion Draft. The team did not name a captain for the 2021–22 season, but recorded 50 wins and 111 points to secure first place in the Pacific Division and return to the playoffs after failing to qualify in 2020–21. They faced the Dallas Stars in the First Round of the 2022 Stanley Cup playoffs, and won the series in seven games with Johnny Gaudreau sealing the series in overtime. This marked the first time the team had advanced to the Second Round of the playoffs since 2015, and since 2004 before that. Their 2021–22 season ended after losing the Second Round best-of-seven series to the Edmonton Oilers in five games, marking the end of the first playoffs "Battle of Alberta" since 1991.

The summer of 2022 was marked by the departures and arrivals of many star players. Both Gaudreau and Tkachuk became free agents in July 2022. The Flames attempted to retain Gaudreau, reportedly offering him an eight-year, $84 million contract extension; instead, the 28-year-old forward signed a seven-year deal to join the Columbus Blue Jackets in unrestricted free agency. Gaudreau explained that the move was for personal reasons, particularly after his father who lives in the eastern United States suffered a heart attack in 2018. Shortly thereafter, Tkachuk — who was a restricted free agent — said he did not want to sign a long term deal in Calgary. After filing for club elected salary arbitration, the Flames traded Tkachuk and a conditional 2025 fourth-round draft pick to the Florida Panthers in exchange for forward Jonathan Huberdeau, defenceman MacKenzie Weegar, prospect Cole Schwindt, and a conditional 2025 first-round selection on July 23, 2022. As part of the trade negotiations Tkachuk signed an eight-year, $76 million contract with the Flames before being traded to the Panthers. Then on August 18, 2022, the Flames traded Monahan and a conditional first-round pick in 2025 to the Montreal Canadiens for future considerations, in a move designed to free up salary cap space. The move made room for the Flames to secure one more high-profile free agent in the summer 2022, Colorado Avalanche star forward Nazem Kadri, who signed a 7-year $49 million contract on the same day. Kadri was coming off a career season, scoring 87 points in 71 games for the Avalanche including 28 goals. The Flames also retained forward Andrew Mangiapane, signing a 3-year, $17 million contract after a career season in Calgary scoring 35 goals and 20 assists.

Huberdeau and Gaudreau both recorded 115 points during the 2021–22 NHL season, tied for second place in NHL scoring behind Edmonton Oilers forward Connor McDavid. Huberdeau agreed to an eight-year, $84 million contract extension with the Flames on August 4, 2022, nearly two weeks after being traded by the Panthers, the most lucrative contract in Flames franchise history, surpassing the seven-year, $45 million deal Sean Monahan signed with the club in 2016. Despite any NHL team losing two 100-point players for the first time in the NHL salary cap era, the moves made by general manager Brad Treliving were praised, with some commentary suggesting the Flames might be a more serious Stanley Cup contender in 2022–23.

Community impact

In 1994, the Flames approached the Saddledome Foundation with a proposal to renovate the Olympic Saddledome, rename it the Canadian Airlines Saddledome and take over management of the facility. The board agreed to this proposal, and was bought out by the Flames for million as the team signed a 20-year agreement to manage the building.

Looking to fill extra dates in the Saddledome, the Flames agreed to a lease deal with the expansion Calgary Hitmen of the junior Western Hockey League who began play in 1995 and were partly owned by Theoren Fleury. Two years later, in 1997, the Flames bought the team for $1.5 million. During the 2004–05 NHL lock-out, the Flames heavily marketed the Hitmen, and as a result, the team led all professional or junior hockey teams in North America in attendance, averaging over 10,000 fans per game.

In April 2006, the Flames announced that they would be opening a hybrid restaurant, bar and entertainment facility in downtown Calgary on Stephen Avenue. In announcing the venture, Flames' President and CEO Ken King stated: "While hockey remains our core competency, we are constantly seeking new opportunities in which to grow the Flames brand and allow our fans greater opportunities to enjoy hockey. We believe establishing a location outside of the Pengrowth Saddledome to share food, fun and hockey will bring our fans even closer to the team." One year later, in April 2007, Flames Central opened to the public. In 2017, the facility reverted to its original name of The Palace Theatre.

Flames Foundation
The Flames have maintained an active presence in the community since their arrival in Calgary. Through the team's non-profit charity, the Flames Foundation, the team has donated over $32 million to causes throughout southern Alberta. Along with the Rotary Club, the Flames are helping to fund the first children's hospice in Alberta, and one of only six in North America.

The Flames are also close partners with the Alberta Children's Hospital and the Gordon Townsend School housed within. Among the many activities the Flames participate in, the Wheelchair Hockey Challenge with the Townsend Tigers has remained a highly popular tradition for both the players and the children involved. In 2010, the Tigers defeated the Flames to move to a perfect 27–0 record since the challenge was first instituted in 1981.

"C of Red"

During the Flames' run to the Stanley Cup Finals of 2004, most of the Flames fans attending the hockey games at the Saddledome wore a red jersey with Calgary's flaming C on it. Sales of the Flames red home jersey, introduced at the start of the 2003–04 campaign, were so strong during the playoffs that manufacturer CCM stopped production on all other team jerseys in order to keep up with demand of Flames uniforms. The team set a league record for sales of a new uniform design. The tradition of the C of Red dates back to the 1986 Stanley Cup playoffs against the Oilers. Oiler fans were donning hats promoting "Hat Trick Fever" in their quest for three straight Stanley Cups. Flames fans countered by wearing red. In the 1987 playoffs against Winnipeg, the Jets responded to the C of Red by encouraging fans to wear white, creating the "Winnipeg whiteout". During the Flames' games when "The Star-Spangled Banner" is sung, fans shout the words see and red to signify the "C of Red" theme. In December 2018, Calgary rock band The Dudes and the Calgary Flames organization teamed up to release a cover of their hockey-themed song "Saturday Night" called "My C is Alright," paying homage to the C of Red.

Red Mile

During the Flames' run to the Stanley Cup Finals of 2004, the city of Calgary essentially became the host of a "non-stop party". The 17th Avenue SW entertainment district, which runs west from the Scotiabank Saddledome, saw as many as 35,000 fans pack the streets during the first three rounds of the playoffs, and over 60,000 in the finals. The Red Mile party received coverage in many newspapers across North America, as the parties remained peaceful and incidents were minimal despite the large number of people in a small area.

In April 2006, the Calgary Police Service announced that Red Mile gatherings would not be encouraged, and that measures would be taken to discourage them, including traffic diversions, a zero-tolerance policy on noise and rowdy behaviour, and the presence of plain-clothed officers among the crowd to ticket offenders. After meeting with the Chief of Police, Mayor Dave Bronconnier convinced the Calgary Police Service to relax their ban on the "Red Mile" and encouraged people to make their way to 17th Ave, however the police retained their zero-tolerance policy on public nudity and drunkenness.

Team information

In-game personalities
Since 2014, Canadian country singer George Canyon sings "O Canada" and "The Star-Spangled Banner" at most home games, and he was accompanied by organist Willy Joosen until his passing in June 2022. If Canyon is unavailable, Michela Sheedy is the usual fill-in. The public-address announcer is Alan Beesley.

Jerseys

The Calgary Flames' original jerseys retained the basic design the team wore in Atlanta: white jerseys with red shoulders and red and yellow stripes, and solid red jerseys with yellow and white stripes. In 1994, the Flames modified their jersey design, adding black to the team's colour scheme. The new striping pattern included a diagonal set of stripes from the base of the jersey on the player's right side coming up to just below the logo. The contrasting shoulder panels on both jerseys were extended down the sleeves, and contained the striping pattern on the forearms. For the 1996–97 season, the Flames reintroduced the Atlanta logo as their alternate captain's patch, and briefly experimented with using a smaller version of the "flaming C" as a captain's patch. Although the C was soon reverted to match the jersey's nameplate, the A logo patch remained in use until the team returned to their original design for the 2020–21 season.

In 1998, to celebrate the "Year of the Cowboy", the Flames introduced its inaugural third jersey design, featuring the "flaming horse" logo on a black background. Two years later, the jersey became the Flames' road jersey, while the home jersey was updated to incorporate the same V-style striping on the arms and waist of the jersey. This jersey was once again relegated to third jersey status in 2003 when the NHL adopted the coloured jerseys for the home team.

In 2007, with the introduction of the Rbk Edge jersey, the Flames updated their look once again, replacing the horizontal striping with vertical striping down the sides. To honour the team's heritage, the Flames added the flags of Alberta and Canada as shoulder patches. In celebration of their 30th season in Calgary, the Flames wore their original jersey design for five games in 2009–10, each against a Canadian opponent. The 2009–10 version of the jersey was produced in the traditional style that preceded the Edge redesign; for the following season, the throwback design was adapted to the Edge format as the Flames' new regular third jersey.

For the 2011 Heritage Classic, the Flames were matched against the Montreal Canadiens at McMahon Stadium. For this event game, the Flames wore uniforms inspired by the Calgary Tigers, the city's first professional hockey team from the 1920s, which represented the Western Canada Hockey League in the 1924 Stanley Cup Finals against the Canadiens. The Flames adapted the Tigers' black-and-gold jerseys to darker shades of their own colours – maroon and burnt yellow, with a yellow stripe across the chest and alternating stripes on the sleeves. The flaming C logo and pants were cream-coloured, adding to the "vintage" look of the uniform.

In 2013, the Flames introduced a new third jersey to replace their throwback uniform. The newest design is Western-inspired, with a script Calgary in black across the front of the jersey, and black shoulders with points on the front mimicking cowboy wear. This uniform was used until the 2015–16 season, after which the throwback third uniforms used from 2010 to 2013 were revived anew.

The Flames retained their current uniform look when the NHL switched to Adidas as its uniform provider in 2017, with the exception of player names and numbers going from an italicized to a straight alignment. The throwback red alternates were not used during the 2017–18 season due to the suspension of the third jersey program, but were restored in the following season.

The 2019 Heritage Classic against the Winnipeg Jets at Regina's Mosaic Stadium featured the return of the Flames' original white uniform in the modern AdiZero cut.

In 2020, the Flames promoted the throwback alternate and Heritage Classic uniforms to primary status, while retaining the black-trimmed red uniforms as an alternate. Also, in November 2020, along with the rest of the league, the Flames released their Reverse Retro jersey. It is very similar to the 1998–2006 alternate/dark jersey, with some slight modifications. The largest difference is that there are only two stripes, a yellow and red one, and nothing below those stripes. The black-trimmed red uniforms were retired after the season. In 2022, the "Blasty" black uniform returned as an alternate, adding the sublimated flame marks on the sleeves. Also in 2022, the Flames unveiled their second "Reverse Retro" uniform, using the 1994–2000 uniform but with black as the base colour.

Logos

The Flames primary logo is the "Flaming C" design, introduced when the team came to Calgary in 1980, and was designed by a Calgarian graphic designer named Patricia Redditt. The design of the logo has remained constant since it was created, though the Flames use a different coloured logo for the home and away jerseys. 

From 1980 until 2000, the home logo was red on a white background, while the road logo was white on a red background; black accents were later added in 1994. In 2003, the NHL switched to using coloured jerseys for the home team. The home logo became black, with the road logo red on a white background. The original "Flaming A" logo of the Atlanta Flames has been restored for use as a patch denoting the team's alternate captains. The flaming horse logo, (colloquially nicknamed "Blasty") was retired in 2007 with the introduction of the new Rbk Edge jerseys. A black-outlined version of the red "Flaming C" appeared on the Flames' white uniforms between 1994 and 2020. It served as the team's primary logo during that time period. Blasty returned when the Flames unveiled their "Reverse Retro" jerseys.

Mascot

Harvey the Hound is the Flames' mascot. He was created in 1983 to serve both with the Flames and the Calgary Stampeders of the Canadian Football League. Harvey was the first mascot in the NHL. Harvey is famous for an incident in January 2003 where he had his tongue ripped out by Edmonton Oilers head coach Craig MacTavish as he was harassing their bench. The incident made headlines throughout North America and led to much humour, including having many other NHL team mascots arrive at the 2003 All-Star Game with their tongues hanging out.

Season-by-season record
This is a partial list of the last five seasons completed by the Flames. For the full season-by-season history, see List of Calgary Flames seasons

Note: GP = Games played, W = Wins, L = Losses, T = Ties, OTL = Overtime losses, Pts = Points, GF = Goals for, GA = Goals against

Players

Current roster

Team captains

 Brad Marsh, 1980–1981
 Phil Russell, 1981–1983
 Doug Risebrough, 1983–1987
 Lanny McDonald, 1983–1989
 Jim Peplinski, 1984–1989
 Brad McCrimmon, 1989–1990
 Rotating captains, 1990–1991
 Joe Nieuwendyk, 1991–1995
 Theoren Fleury, 1995–1997
 Todd Simpson, 1997–1999
 Steve Smith, 1999–2000
 Dave Lowry, 2000–2002
 Bob Boughner, 2002
 Craig Conroy, 2002–2003
 Jarome Iginla, 2003–2013
 Mark Giordano, 2013–2021

McDonald and Risebrough were co-captains in 1983–1984. McDonald, Peplinski and Risebrough were tri-captains 1984–1987. McDonald and Peplinski were co-captains 1987–1989.

Boughner and Conroy were co-captains for the latter half of 2001–2002 after Dave Lowry was stripped of the captaincy.

Honoured members

Retired numbers

The Calgary Flames have retired three numbers, and a fourth was retired league-wide. The Flames retired No. 9 in honour of Lanny McDonald who played right wing for the Flames from 1981 to 1989, winning the Stanley Cup as the Flames' co-captain in his final year. Mike Vernon's No. 30 is also retired; he was a goaltender with the Flames for 14 years, from 1982 to 1994 and from 2000 to 2002. The Flames retired Jarome Iginla's No. 12 on March 2, 2019; he played right wing for the Flames from 1996 to 2013 and also served as the team's captain from 2003 to 2013. The NHL retired Wayne Gretzky's No. 99 for all its member teams at the 2000 NHL All-Star Game. Although not officially retired, the Flames have not issued No. 14 since Theoren Fleury left the team in 1999, and No. 34 since Miikka Kiprusoff retired while still a member of the Flames in 2013.

In 2012, the Flames organization introduced the "Forever a Flame" programme to honour those who played and represented the Calgary Flames without having to retire their numbers. It enables future Flames the opportunity to wear the numbers of some of the Flames' most respected former players. On February 27, 2012, defenceman Al MacInnis was the first to earn this distinction, with a banner with his picture and his No. 2 raised to the Scotiabank Saddledome rafters. Joe Nieuwendyk was treated likewise on March 7, 2014, promoted as "Forever 25" for both the number on Nieuwendyk's jersey and the 25th anniversary of the 1989 title.

Hockey Hall of Fame members
Several members of the Flames organization have been honoured by the Hockey Hall of Fame during the team's history in Calgary.

Eleven former Flames have been elected to the Hall of Fame, five of whom earned their credentials primarily in Calgary. Lanny McDonald was the first Flame player inducted, gaining election in 1992. McDonald recorded 215 goals in 492 games over seven and a half seasons for the Flames, including a team-record 66 goals in 1982–83. He was joined in 2000 by a fellow member of the 1989 Stanley Cup championship team, Joe Mullen. Mullen spent five seasons with the Flames, recording 388 points and capturing two Lady Byng Trophies. Grant Fuhr, elected in 2003, became the third former Flames player to enter the Hall. Fuhr played only one season in Calgary; however, he recorded his 400th career win in a Flames uniform, a victory over the Florida Panthers on October 22, 1999. In 2007, Al MacInnis became the fourth former Flame inducted into the Hall, and the third to earn his Hall of Fame credentials primarily as a Flame. MacInnis was a member of the Flames from 1981 until 1994. He is best remembered for his booming slapshot, as well as for winning the Conn Smythe Trophy in 1989 as playoff MVP. On November 9, 2009, Brett Hull became the fifth player in Calgary Flames history to be inducted into the Hockey Hall of Fame.
Hull was drafted 117th in the 1984 NHL Entry Draft by the Flames, and began his NHL career playing two seasons (1986–1988) with Calgary. On June 28, 2011, it was announced that former Flames forwards Doug Gilmour and Joe Nieuwendyk would become the sixth and seventh members to enter the Hockey Hall of Fame in the players category. On June 29, 2015, the Hockey Hall of Fame announced defenceman Phil Housley would be enshrined in the Class of 2015, making him the eighth player in Flames history to gain that honour. Housley played for the Flames on two separate occasions, (1994–1996 and 1998–2001). Sergei Makarov was informed on June 27, 2016, that he would be entering the Hockey Hall of Fame as a part of the Class of 2016. Makarov becomes the ninth Flames player to receive the honour. Makarov was drafted 231st in the 1983 NHL Entry Draft, and joined the Flames in 1989, where he won the Calder Memorial Trophy as rookie of the year at the age of 31. Makarov played for the Flames from 1989 to 1993. Martin St. Louis became the tenth player to be inducted into the hall. The Hall of Fame announcement occurred on June 26, 2018. St. Louis was a part of the Flames organization from 1997 to 2000, splitting his time with the Flames' American Hockey League affiliate Saint John Flames and the main roster. On June 24, 2020, Jarome Iginla became the eleventh player inducted into the Hall of Fame. Iginla played for the Flames from 1996 to 2013, during his time with the team he won many awards including the Art Ross Trophy, the Lester B. Pearson Award and the Maurice "Rocket" Richard Trophy.

Former head coach "Badger" Bob Johnson joined McDonald in the class of 1992, gaining election as a builder. Johnson coached five seasons with the Flames from 1982 to 1987, and his 193 wins remain a team record. Cliff Fletcher was the Flames general manager from the organization's inception in 1972 until 1991, a span of 19 years. During that time, the Flames qualified for the playoffs sixteen consecutive times between 1976 and 1991. Fletcher was inducted in 2004. In 2006, Harley Hotchkiss became the third Flames builder to gain election. He an original member of the ownership group that purchased and brought the Flames to Calgary in 1980. He was the team's longtime governor, and hence the public face of the consortium. He has served many years as the chairman of the NHL board of directors, during which he played a significant role in the resolution of the 2004–05 lock-out. Fellow original owner Doc Seaman was similarly inducted in 2010. On June 29, 2015, former player Bill Hay was elected to the Hockey of Fame in the builders category. Hay served as president and CEO for the Flames in the 1990s.

Flames radio broadcaster Peter Maher was named the recipient of the Foster Hewitt Memorial Award in 2006 for his years of service as the radio play-by-play announcer for the Calgary Flames. Maher was the radio voice of the Flames from 1981 to 2014, starting in the team's second season in Calgary. He has called six All-Star Games and four Stanley Cup Finals. Longtime trainer Bearcat Murray was inducted into the Hall of Fame in 2009 by the Professional Hockey Athletic Trainers Society and the Society of Professional Hockey Equipment Managers.

Franchise scoring leaders
These are the top-ten point-scorers in franchise (Atlanta and Calgary) history.

See also
 Ice hockey in Calgary
 List of ice hockey teams in Alberta
 List of Calgary Flames broadcasters

References

Footnotes

Further reading

External links

 

 
1972 establishments in Georgia (U.S. state)
Calgary Sports and Entertainment
Ice hockey clubs established in 1972
National Hockey League in Alberta
National Hockey League teams based in Canada
Pacific Division (NHL)
National Hockey League teams